The 1978 King Cup was the 20th season of the knockout competition since its establishment in 1956. Al-Ahli were the defending champions and successfully defended the title, winning their second one in a row. Al-Ahli beat Al-Riyadh who became the first First Division side to reach the final.

By winning both the 1977–78 Saudi Premier League and the 1978 King Cup, Al-Ahli became the first Saudi team to achieve the domestic double.

Bracket

Source: Bracket

Round of 32
The matches of the Round of 32 were held on 30 and 31 March 1978.

Round of 16
The Round of 16 matches were held on 5 and 6 April 1978.

Quarter-finals
The Quarter-final matches were held on 11 and 12 April 1978.

Semi-finals
The four winners of the quarter-finals progressed to the semi-finals. The semi-finals were played on 16 April 1978. All times are local, AST (UTC+3).

Final
The final was played between Al-Ahli and Al-Riyadh in the Youth Welfare Stadium in Riyadh. By reaching the final Al-Riyadh became the first First Division side to reach the final. This final was a repeat of the 1962 final which ended in a win for Al-Ahli.

References

1978
Saudi Arabia
Cup